Gomalia albofasciata, the Asian marbled skipper, is a species of spread-wing skipper in the butterfly family Hesperiidae. It is found in India and Sri Lanka.

This species was formerly a subspecies of Gomalia elma, but was elevated in rank to species as a result of genomic research published in 2020.

References

Further reading

 

Carcharodini